Claus Erhorn (born 18 January 1959 in Hamburg-Harburg) is a German equestrian and Olympic champion. He won a team gold medal in eventing at the 1988 Summer Olympics in Seoul.

References

External links
 
 

1959 births
Living people
Olympic equestrians of West Germany
German male equestrians
Equestrians at the 1984 Summer Olympics
Equestrians at the 1988 Summer Olympics
Olympic gold medalists for West Germany
Olympic bronze medalists for West Germany
German event riders
Olympic medalists in equestrian
Medalists at the 1988 Summer Olympics
Medalists at the 1984 Summer Olympics